Solu Music is a New York-based record label and house music producing duo created by Howie Caspe and Dano Nathanson.

History

Solu Music are best known for their song "Fade" feat. Kimblee. Recorded in 2001 and initially released as an underground track, Fade was released as a single in 2006 and became a minor hit in several countries. It is featured on numerous house music compilations.

Discography

Singles

Fade (2001)
Afrika (2001)
The Way I'll Feel (If You Touch) (2002)
Love Come Around (2003)
Can't Help Myself (2004)
Can't Help Myself (Remixes) (2004)
This Time (2004)
It Ain't Love (2005)
Let It Flow (Fudge Mixes) / Tenement (2006)

EP's

A Night At The Barracuda E.P. (2003)

Albums

Affirmation (2004)

Chart success

References

External links
Official Website
Solu Music at Discogs
Myspace Page
Fade music video

American electronic musicians